Galician-language literature is the literature written in Galician. The earliest works in Galician language are from the early 13th-century trovadorismo tradition. In the Middle Ages, Galego-português (Galician-Portuguese) was a language of culture, poetry (troubadours) and religion throughout not only Galicia and Portugal but also in the Castile-León region.

After the separation of Portuguese and Galician, Galician was considered provincial and was not widely used for literary or academic purposes. It was with  the Rexurdimento ("Rebirth"), in the mid-19th century that Galician was used again in literature, and then in politics.

Much literature by Galician authors is written in Spanish, such as by Ignacio Ramonet or Gonzalo Torrente Ballester - though such writers tend to be excluded from discussion of Galician literature and counted as Spanish-language literature.

Rosalia Castro de Murguía's Cantares Gallegos (1863; Galician Songs) was the first Galician-language book to be published in four centuries. Related to literature, Chano Pineiro's 1989 Sempre Xonxa (Forever a Woman) is regarded as the first Galician-language film. The intellectual group Xeración Nós, a name that alludes to the Irish Sinn Féin ("We Ourselves") promoted Galician culture in the 1920s. Xeración Galaxia was established to translate modern texts that would link an independent Galician culture with the European context. The Galician translation of the Bible was begun in 1968 by Editorial SEPT and published in 1989.

Authors

Main authors

Middle Ages

Alfonso X of Castile
Xohán de Cangas
Martín Codax
Mendinho

Dark Centuries
Padre Sarmiento

19th century
Rosalía de Castro
Manuel Murguía
Francisco Añón
Manuel Curros Enríquez
Eduardo Pondal

20th century
Álvaro Cunqueiro
Vicente Risco
Xohán Vicente Viqueira
Evaristo Martelo Paumán
Xesús Ferro Couselo
Celso Emilio Ferreiro (exiled in Venezuela)
Rafael Dieste
Eduardo Blanco Amor
Alfonso Daniel Rodríguez Castelao (exiled in Argentina)
Fermín Bouza Brei
Carlos Casares Mouriño
Xosé Neira Vilas (exiled in Cuba)
Antón Vilar Ponte
Luís Seoane (born in Argentina and exiled there and in Mexico)
Dario Xoan Cabana
Silvio Santiago (exiled in Venezuela)
Ánxel Fole
Manuel Rodriguez Lopez

Contemporary
Manuel Rivas
Suso de Toro
Xurxo Borrazás
Teresa Moure
Xosé Ramón Pena
Xosé Luís Méndez Ferrín
Pilar Pallarés
Marilar Aleixandre
Ana Romaní
Olga Novo
Estíbaliz Espinosa
Berta Dávila
María do Cebreiro
Chus Pato
Ismael Ramos

For a more extensive list of Galician-language writers, see Día das Letras Galegas

Other Authors

Federico García Lorca. The poet from Granada wrote "Six Galician Poems" in Galician language.

See also
 Literature by Galician authors
 Día das Letras Galegas ("Galician Literature Day") on May 17

Further reading
 Xosé Ramón Pena. Historia da Literatura Galega I. Das orixes a 1853, Xerais, 2013. 978-84-9914-551-8  
 Xosé Ramón Pena. Historia da Literatura Galega II. De 1853 a 1916. O Rexurdimento, Xerais, 2014. 978-84-9914-764-2  
 Xosé Ramón Pena. Historia da Literatura Galega III. De 1916 a 1936. Xerais, 2016. 978-84-9121-107-5

References

Literature by language
Galician literature
European literature
Galician language